This is a list of Anseriformes species by global population. While numbers are estimates, they have been made by the experts in their fields.

Anseriformes (Anser being Latin for "goose") is the taxonomic order to which the ducks, geese, swans, and screamers belong. BirdLife International has assessed 166 species; 89 (54% of total species) have had their population estimated. A variety of methods are used for counting waterfowl. For example, in North America, national and sub-national agencies use planes and helicopters to make aerial transects of breeding populations, and extrapolate these counts over the species' known ranges. Methodologies are continuously being refined; thus estimates can be expected to become more accurate over time. Forecasts can be made by studying habitat condition trends and by interviewing local experts. For more information on how these estimates were ascertained, see Wikipedia's articles on population biology and population ecology.

The first bird in this list, the crested shelduck, retains a status of Critically Endangered on the IUCN Red List but may in fact be extinct. The last confirmed reporting was in 1964 near Vladivostok. North Korea claimed a sighting in March 1971, but this record is highly suspect. Unconfirmed reports do, however, periodically roll in from Northeast China, giving scientists hope that the last individual has not yet died.
To be assessed as Critically Endangered a species must have experienced a decline of at least 80% in the past ten years or three generations, or be projected to decline that much in the future ten years or three generations. As some species below are rapidly approaching their minimum viable population (MVP), the future may see their removal from the list and addition to the preceding paragraph.

Extinct species:
 Réunion shelduck, the last of which had been hunted by 1710;
 Mauritian shelduck, which was plentiful in 1681 and extinct in 1698;
 Amsterdam duck, reported to be the favourite dish of Île Amsterdam's five resident sealers until 1793;
 Mauritian duck, which was found in "great numbers" in 1681 and last reported in 1696;
 Mariana mallard, a pair of which would not breed at SeaWorld and which has not been encountered since the death of the last individual there in 1981;
 Finsch's duck, once the most abundant waterfowl species in New Zealand;
 Labrador duck, which has not been seen in northeast North America since 1875;
 Auckland merganser, all searches for which have been for naught since the last recording in 1902.

Species by global population

See also
 
Lists of birds by population
Lists of organisms by population
List of duck breeds

References

Birds
Anseriformes